The moss-forest rat (Rattus niobe) is a species of rodent in the family Muridae.
It is found in Indonesia and Papua New Guinea.

Names
It is known as katgn in the Kalam language of Papua New Guinea.

References

Rattus
Rodents of Papua New Guinea
Mammals described in 1906
Taxa named by Oldfield Thomas
Taxonomy articles created by Polbot